The Peach County Courthouse is located in Fort Valley, Georgia.  It was built in 1936.  It is of the Colonial Revival (or more specifically Williamsburg Revival style), and is one of only a few Colonial Revival-style courthouses in Georgia.  It is the first courthouse built in Peach County, which is the newest county formed in the state, in 1924.

It has a two-story gable-roofed central section with a pedimented bay.  It has a T-shaped addition added in 1972, making the interior into an H-pattern.

It was added to the National Register of Historic Places in 1980.

References

External links
 

Courthouses on the National Register of Historic Places in Georgia (U.S. state)
National Register of Historic Places in Peach County, Georgia
Colonial Revival architecture in Georgia (U.S. state)
Government buildings completed in 1936
Peach County, Georgia